Dark Victory is a 1939 film based on a 1934 stageplay.

Dark Victory may also refer to:

In literature:
 Dark Victory (book), a book by David Marr and Marian Wilkinson
 Dark Victory (novel), a Star Trek novel by William Shatner
 A Dark Victory, a novel in the Tenabran Trilogy by Dave Luckett
 Batman: Dark Victory, a comic book series
 Dark Victory: The Life of Bette Davis, a book by Ed Sikov

In television:
 "Dark Victory", an episode of Frasier
 "Dark Victory", the two-part series finale of Legion of Super Heroes
 Dark Victory, a 1976 remake of the 1939 film, starring Elizabeth Montgomery